Whoo Hoo! Wiggly Gremlins! is the 17th album by children's music group The Wiggles. It was released in 2003 by ABC Music distributed by Roadshow Entertainment. It was nominated for the ARIA Award for Best Children's Album in 2003 but lost to Hi-5's Celebrate.

Track list
All tracks written by Murray Cook, Jeff Fatt, Anthony Field, Greg Page, John Field, Dominic Lindsay except listed below.

Charts

Video

The video "Whoo Hoo! Wiggly Gremlins" was also released in 2003.

Song list
 "Camera One"
 "Gulp Gulp"
 "Testing One, Two, Three"
 "Bit By Bit (We're Building a Set)"
 "Vegetable Soup"
 "Hats"
 "Music with Murray"
 "Lights, Camera, Action, Wiggles!"
 "Dressing Up"
 "Where's Jeff?"
 "Anthony's Workshop"

Bonus songs
 "The Dancing Flowers"
 "Go to Sleep Jeff" (Brahms' lullaby)

Cast
The cast as presented on the videos:

The Wiggles:
 Murray Cook
 Jeff Fatt
 Anthony Field
 Greg Page

Additional cast
 Paul Paddick as Captain Feathersword
 Corrine O’Rafferty as Dorothy the Dinosaur
 Jacqueline Field as Voice of Dorothy
 Andrew McCourt as Wags the Dog
 Kristy Talbot as Henry the Octopus
 Simon Pryce and Kase Amer as Gremlins
 Sharryn Dermody, Ben Murray, and Larissa Wright as Stagehands/Dancers
 Dominic Field and Joseph Field as Junior Stagehands
 Nicholas Bufalo as Voice of Big Red Car

Releases
 Australia: 1 September 2003
 USA: 27 July 2004

References

External links

2003 albums
The Wiggles albums
2003 video albums
The Wiggles videos
Australian children's musical films